Adrian Leonard Fellowes Lukis (born 28 March 1957) is an English actor who has appeared regularly in British television drama since the late 1980s. His most recent notable appearances have been as Sergeant Doug Wright in the police drama series The Bill and as Marc Thompson in the BBC legal drama Judge John Deed.

Background
Lukis is descended from the Channel Islands archaeologist Frederick Lukis.

Lukis was educated at Mount House School (now known as Mount Kelly), in Tavistock, Devon and Wellington College.

Career
Lukis had roles as a regular in the 2nd series of Chandler & Co (1995), playing Mark Judd, and in Peak Practice (1997-1999), playing Dr David Shearer. He played Mr. George Wickham in the BBC's 1995 adaption of Jane Austen's Pride and Prejudice. He also appeared in ITV’s one-off drama Back Home and in the BBC rural drama series Down to Earth.

He had previously appeared in The Casebook of Sherlock Holmes (as Bennett in The Creeping Man), Maigret, Miss Marple, Campion, The Strauss Dynasty and Prime Suspect. He played Simon Avery in Silent Witness Series 15 Episode 2, Death Has No Dominion.  For radio, he appeared as George Vavasour in BBC Radio 4's 2004 adaptation of Anthony Trollope's The Pallisers. He also appeared in Midsomer Murders “Dead in the Water” (2004) as Phillip Trent and in Silk as Patrick Stephens. In 2013 he played General Ravenscroft in Agatha Christie's Poirot “Elephants Can Remember”. 

From 2013 to the present day, Lukis has played the recurring role of Colonel Blair Toast in the Channel 4 series Toast of London. In 2014 he appeared in the Midsomer Murders episode “The Killings of Copenhagen” as Julian Calder. In 2015, Lukis appeared as Francis Davison in the BBC TV series Death in Paradise “Damned If You Do” (Episode 4.3), and as Laurence Olivier in the European premiere of the Austin Pendleton play Orson's Shadow at the Southwark Playhouse in London. In 2015 he appeared in Downton Abbey as Sir John Darnley.

In 2016, he appeared as Home Secretary Alex Wallis in "Hated in the Nation", an episode of the anthology series Black Mirror.

In September 2019 he reprised his role as George Wickham in the world premiere of Being Mr Wickham, a new play co-written with Catherine Curzon and performed at the Old Georgian Theatre Royal in Bath as part of the Jane Austen Festival. In 2020, he appeared in Mae Martin's sitcom Feel Good, playing Mae's father.

In October 2022, Lukis starred in the BBC series SAS: Rogue Heroes playing General Claude Auchinleck.

References

External links

 

1957 births
Living people
People from Birmingham, West Midlands
Alumni of the Drama Studio London
English male television actors
20th-century English male actors
21st-century English male actors